The Vicariate Apostolic of El Petén is a Latin Church ecclesiastical jurisdiction or apostolic vicariate of the Catholic Church in Petén Department, Guatemala.
 
Its cathedral is the Catedral Nuestra Señora de Los Remedios y San Pablo Itzá, in see of Flores, Guatemala.

History 
It was erected 10 March 1951, as the apostolic administration of El Petén.

It was elevated to apostolic vicariate on 3 February 1984, hence entitled to a titular bishop, but remains directly exempt to the Holy See, not part of any ecclesiastical province.

Ordinaries 
 Apostolic Administrators of El Petén
 Raymundo Julian Martín, Dominican Order (O.P.) Apostolic Administrator ad nutum Sanctae Sedis (1951.03.10 – 1956), while Bishop of Vera Paz (Guatemala) (1945.11.14 – 1966.05.28)
 Gabriel Viñamata Castelsagué, Saint Francis Xavier Spanish Institute for Foreign Missions (I.E.M.E.) (1956.07.11 – death 1964)
 Gennaro Artazcor Lizarrage, I.E.M.E. (1964.01.04 – death 1969)
 Aguado Arraux, I.E.M.E. (1969 – death 1970)
 Luis María Estrada Paetau, O.P. (1970.11.30 – 1977.10.27), later Apostolic Administrator of Izabal (Guatemala) (1977.10.27 – 1988.03.12) & Titular Bishop of Regiæ (1977.10.27 – 2011.03.25), Apostolic Vicar of above Izabal (1988.03.12 – 2004.05.21)
 Jorge Mario Avila del Aguila, Lazarists (C.M.) (1987.01.29 – 2001.12.05 see below)

 Apostolic Vicars of El Petén
 Jorge Mario Avila del Aguila, C.M. (see above 1984.02.03 – 1987.01.29), Titular Bishop of Nasai (1982.12.03 – 1987.01.29); later Bishop of Jalapa (Guatemala) (1987.01.29 – 2001.12.05), Secretary General of Episcopal Secretariat of Central America and Panama (1988–1992), President of Episcopal Conference of Guatemala (1994–1998)
 Rodolfo Francisco Bobadilla Mata, C.M. (1987.05.15 – 1996.09.28), Titular Bishop of Lari Castellum (1987.05.15 – 1996.09.28), later Bishop of Huehuetenango (Guatemala) (1996.09.28 – 2012.05.14)
 Oscar Julio Vian Morales, Salesians of Don Bosco (S.D.B.) (1996.11.30 – 2007.04.19), Titular Bishop of Pupiana (1996.11.30 – 2007.04.19), later Metropolitan Archbishop of Los Altos, Quetzaltenango–Totonicapán (Guatemala) (2007.04.19 – 2010.10.02), Metropolitan Archbishop of Guatemala (2010.10.02 – 2013.04.25), restyled Metropolitan Archbishop of Santiago de Guatemala (Guatemala) (2013.04.25 – ...)
 Pro-Vicar Apostolic Octavio Sassu, O.P. (2007 – 2009.02.10)
 Mario Fiandri, S.D.B. (2009.02.10 – ...), Titular Bishop of Madarsuma (2009.02.10 – ...)

References

External links 
 GigaCatholic, with incumbent biography links

Apostolic vicariates
Roman Catholic dioceses in Guatemala
Christian organizations established in 1951
Roman Catholic dioceses and prelatures established in the 20th century
1951 establishments in Guatemala